Maria (stylized as MARIA) was an all female Japanese pop rock band signed onto Sony Music Japan. The band consists of six members. They released their first single on March 8, 2006, titled "Chiisa na Uta". This song is used as the 3rd opening song of the anime Yakitate!! Japan. Also, their single Tsubomi is used as the theme song of Naruto the Movie 3: Guardians of the Crescent Moon Kingdom, and their single Heartbeat was used as an opening theme song of the anime Deltora Quest.

In 2006 came out their first album, entitled "You Go!: We Are Maria", but their popularity really came to raise after "Tsubomi" single release. In 2008, though, Maria came out with their first DVD, featuring a live tour for the first album, and was entitled "Maria Live Tour - We Are Maria 2007", which reached the height of 30th place in Oricon parade.

Maria disbanded in 2010 due to Tattsu's thoracic outlet syndrome, which made it impossible for her to continue playing. Rather than continue with a replacement, they let their contract with Sony lapse.

Members
The band has been having the same formation since its beginning; it is composed by three vocals, two basses, two guitars, a drum, an electric keyboard, and a violin.

Maiko - Lead Vocals, Bass
Aika - Vocals, Bass
Ayuka - Electric Guitar
Sacchin - Electric Guitar, Leader
Reina - Keyboards, Electric Violin
Tattsu - Drums, Back-up Vocals

DVD
Maria Live Tour - We Are Maria 2007: You Go!!~ (March 26, 2008) - 30th place in Oricon
 Natsu Egao (夏えがお)
 Chiisana Shi (小さな詩)
 h@ccha ke (h@ッちゃけ)
 Heartbeat (Heart☆beat)
 Kirari Natsu (キラリ夏)
 Watch Me
 Tsubomi (つぼみ)
 Anata ni... (あなたに...)
 Mabudachi
 High×2 Furaingu (high×2 フライング☆)
 Jump
 Hey! Bun! (Hey＊02♪ ブン＊02♪)
 Ichiban Hoshi (いちばん星)
 Arigatou no Kotoba Kara (ありがとうの言葉から)

Discography

References

External links
 Official website

Japanese rock music groups
Sony Music Entertainment Japan artists
Japanese pop music groups
All-female bands
Studioseven Recordings artists